Miccolamia thailandensis is a species of beetle in the family Cerambycidae. It was described by Breuning and Chujo in 1966. It is known from Thailand (from which its species epithet is derived).

References

Desmiphorini
Beetles described in 1966